The 2017 Reykjavik Tournament was the 17th season of Iceland's annual pre-season tournament. The tournament involved nine of Reykjavík's top football sides from the top two leagues in Iceland, Úrvalsdeild karla and 1. deild, and used a combination of group and knockout rounds to determine which team was the winner of the tournament. The competition began on 8 January 2017 and concluded on 13 February 2017.

Groups

Group A

Matches

Group B

Matches

Semifinals
The top two teams from each group entered the semifinals stage. The ties were played on 9 February 2017 at Egilshöll, Reykjavík, one after the other.

Final
The 2017 Reykjavik Tournament final was contested between Valur and Fjölnir, the winners of the two semifinal matches. The final was played at Egilshöll, Reykjavík, on 13 February 2017.

Top scorers

References

Football in Iceland